The Big East Conference baseball tournament is the conference championship tournament in baseball for the Big East Conference. It is a double-elimination tournament and seeding is based on regular-season records. The winner receives the conference's automatic bid to the NCAA Division I baseball tournament.  The Big East Tournament champion is separate from the conference champion.  The conference championship is determined solely by regular-season record.

From 1985 to 2013, the tournament was sponsored by the old Big East Conference. Starting with the 2014 tournament, it has been sponsored by the newly formed, non-football Big East Conference.

Tournament
The Big East Conference baseball tournament is a four-team double-elimination tournament, held annually at various locations in the Big East Conference region.  The four teams with the best conference record at the end of the regular season earn berths in the tournament.  The winner earns the Big East's automatic bid to the NCAA Division I baseball tournament.  The remaining Big East teams can also qualify for the 64-team NCAA Tournament by receiving an at-large bid.

History
The tournament was first held in 1985.

1985–1995
The tournament consisted of four teams competing in a double-elimination tournament.

1996–2000
The tournament was expanded to a six-team, double-elimination tournament.

2001–2005
The tournament returned to a four-team, double-elimination format.

2006–2013
The tournament was expanded to become an eight-team, double-elimination tournament.

2014
In the 2012–2013 academic year, the old Big East Conference had 15 members. In its inaugural 2013–2014 academic year, the new Big East Conference had only 10 members.

With only seven baseball-sponsoring schools in the conference, the top four teams participate.

Champions

By year 

All championship information, including tournament results, all-tournament teams, and Jack Kaiser award winners, can be found on pages 64–66 of the 2009 Big East Baseball Media Guide.

By school

Italics indicate that the program is no longer a Big East member.

See also
Baseball awards#U.S. college baseball

References

External links
2008 Big East Baseball Media Guide

 
Recurring sporting events established in 1985
1985 establishments in the United States